Rząśnik is a village in the administrative district of Gmina Stary Lubotyń, within Ostrów Mazowiecka County, Masovian Voivodeship, in east-central Poland.

The village has a population of 264.

History 
During World War II, in summer 1941, about 2,600 Jews from nearby villages are murdered in mass executions perpetrated by an Einsatzgruppen.

References

Villages in Ostrów Mazowiecka County